Buisu or Boisu or Bwisu is the new year festival of Tripuri people in Bangaldesh and Indian state of Tripura.

The word buisu has been derived from the Tripuri language Kokborok root word bisi which means a year. Buisu is one of the ancient Tripuri festival celebrated with lot of joy enthusiasm in every Tripuri household.

See also
Indian New Year's days
Tripuri calendar

References

Tripuri culture
New Year in India
New Year celebrations